Harrison Valley is an unincorporated community in Potter County, Pennsylvania, United States.

References

Unincorporated communities in Potter County, Pennsylvania
Unincorporated communities in Pennsylvania